Adult dating or no-strings-attached dating is a variant of a traditional online dating service. Where traditional services aim to bringing people together for the purposes of a meaningful relationship or friendship, adult dating  is aimed at those who are seeking short-term sexual encounters. Many adult dating sites focus on the local aspect of finding a match. Some users regard the service as no different from finding a one-night stand on a night out. Some of these services are free and some of them require buying a subscription.

Some adult dating sites are deliberately aimed at married people seeking to have affairs, and have been criticized by Christian groups who are actively campaigning against such sites in the United Kingdom after the ASA did not upheld complaints against the advertising of such services.

This form of dating is a growing niche within the dating world, with many sites offering an adult dating service, even if their offerings aren't strictly adult oriented. Many sites such as POF also offer a more adult alternative to their dating niches.

There is also a variety of adult dating sites for specific purposes that help people find exact type of intimate relationship they want.

In the United Kingdom, Channel Four investigated adult dating sites as part of its 2013 series Mating Season.

Adult dating has also been widely criticized for their use of "bots" or profiles created by the website itself in lieu of sufficient female users. Male members of such sites are often contacted by these 'members' and then must pay some fee or sign up to a subscription in order to reply or maintain contact with these 'members', one of the most high profile cases involved the extramarital site Ashley Madison. Some adult dating sites have attempted to shift this imbalance by offering free memberships to women in hopes of facilitating more female users.

References 

Adult dating websites
Online dating services